KNBS may refer to:

 KNBS, a radio station in Bowling Green, Missouri formerly known as KPVR
 King's Norton Boys' School
 Kenya National Bureau of Statistics
 KNBS (TV), a TV station in Walla Walla, Washington in 1960